Ergersheim is a municipality  in the Middle Franconian district of  Neustadt (Aisch)-Bad Windsheim. Administrative offices are located in Uffenheim.

Villages
Ergersheim
Ermetzhofen
Kellermühle
Neuherberg
Obermühle
Seenheim

History
The first mention of Ergersheim was on December 25, 822 in a charter from the Emperor Louis the Pious.

Ergersheim is home to the oldest chapel of the area, which was built during that era, and is still used for special church functions.

Politics

The town council is made up of 12 members.
Election in 2014: (Comparison to 2008):
Wählergemeinschaft Gemeinde Ermetzhofen 5 seats (± 0)
Freie Wählergemeinschaft Ergersheim 7 seats (± 0)

Twin town
Ergersheim, Bas-Rhin

References

External links
 

Neustadt (Aisch)-Bad Windsheim